The Kincaid House is a historic house in Speedwell, Tennessee, U.S.. It was built circa 1840 by John Kincaid II for his brother, William Harrison Kincaid. In 1880, it was acquired by the Bryant family, who sold it to Bill Russell in 1898. It has been listed on the National Register of Historic Places since March 22, 1982.

References

Houses on the National Register of Historic Places in Tennessee
Houses completed in 1840
Buildings and structures in Claiborne County, Tennessee